"Hate to See You Go" (or "I Hate to See You Go") is a blues song written and recorded by Chicago blues artist Little Walter.  In 1955, Checker Records released it as one of three singles by Walter that year. The song, a one chord modal blues, is a reworking of "You Don't Love Me", written by Bo Diddley and recorded one month prior.  

In 2016, the Rolling Stones recorded the song, which was released as the second single from their anticipated covers album Blue & Lonesome.

Composition and recording
During his first session for Leonard Chess' Checker Records on March 2–3, 1955, Bo Diddley recorded "You Don't Love Me" (often subtitled "You Don't Care"). Unlike his self-titled debut song recorded at the same session, which introduced the signature beat, "You Don't Love Me" uses a conventional beat. Also, it does not follow the typical I–IV–V blues chord progression, but remains on one chord throughout. 

Little Walter liked the "driving groove and Bo's distinctive guitar sound" and decided to record the number with his own lyrics: 

The title line "hate to see you go" does not appear in the song. Bo Diddley agreed to record the song with Walter and provided the same "descending guitar 'hook' line" from his earlier recording. The April 28, 1955, recording session at Universal Studios in Chicago also included Luther Tucker on guitar, Willie Dixon on bass, and Fred Below on drums. According to his biographers, "In Walter's hands, the tune is a stomping rocker, with his harp [harmonica] just at the edge of feeding back, and the band pounding out the rhythm."

Releases
Checker chose not to release Bo Diddley's earlier "You Don't Love Me", but instead issued "Hate to See You Go", as the follow-up to Little Walter's "Roller Coaster", which had reached No. 6 on Billboard magazine's R&B Juke Box chart. Released on a single in both 45 rpm 7-inch and 78 rpm 10-inch single formats, it included the Dixon composition "Too Late" as the second side. Neither song, however, appeared on the charts. 

In 1959, Bo Diddley's song was included on his second album, Go Bo Diddley and in 1967, he, along with Muddy Waters and Little Walter, recorded a version for the Super Blues album. In 1969, "Hate to See You Go" became the title track for the Chess Little Walter anthology Hate to See You Go.

The Rolling Stones version

On 8 November 2016, the Rolling Stones released a video for their version of "Hate to See You Go". The album itself was a return to the band's blues roots, and co-producer Don Was said it was a manifest testament to the purity of the Stones' love for making music. 

The Rolling Stones' version of "Hate to See You Go" is an harmonica-driven call-and-response between a cyclical riff and a four-chord rhythm sequence. The track was included on the 2019 compilation album Honk.

Charts
The single reached No. 78 in the UK, No. 181 in France, and No. 1 on the Billboard Digital Blues Song Sales chart.

Footnotes

References

1955 songs
1955 singles
Checker Records singles
Little Walter songs
Blues songs
Songs written by Little Walter
2016 singles
The Rolling Stones songs